MKS Dąbrowa Górnicza may refer to:
 MKS Dąbrowa Górnicza (basketball), professional basketball team
 MKS Dąbrowa Górnicza (volleyball), professional women's volleyball team